Ximena Luisa Rivas Hanson (born Santiago, August 12, 1963) is a Chilean actress of theater, film and television.

Acting career 
Her career began with one of the most important works of the Chilean theater La negra Ester (1988), where she played several roles, Zulema, the prostitute with long legs, Lily, Esther's sister; and Violeta Parra (his brother Roberto Parra Sandoval being the composer of Las décimas de La negra Ester) where she also performed the song La Jardinera. This work and participation was in the company Gran Circo Teatro (1988–1994) directed by the great Chilean theater teacher Andrés Pérez Araya. In 1995 she was summoned by the television director Vicente Sabatini —who went to watch her at the Teatro de la Universidad Católica in Molière's Tartufo play, where she played the funny Dorina— and integrates her into the cast of the romantic comedy Estúpido Cupido, by Televisión Nacional de Chile, where she played the employee Felicita Bonita, sharing credits with José Soza.

Rivas joined the Golden Age of National Television telenovelas, collaborating with Sabatini and María Eugenia Rencoret between 1995 and 2006. In 1997 she played Eva Félix in Tic Tac, directed by Rencoret. The role of her was received by the audience with rave reviews along with Bastián Bodenhöfer, and she received by the Association of Show Journalists, the Apes Award for the best leading actress on television. Due to her popularity, the following year, she starred in Borrón y cuenta nueva (1998) alongside Patricia Rivadeneira and Sigrid Alegría. In 1999 he got the leading role in The Sentimental Teaser, directed by Roberto Artiagoitía, one of the most watched films in the history of Chilean cinema. In the same year, she played La Poncia in Aquelarre, with great reception, in which she received the Apes Award for Best Supporting Actress and earned a Best Actress nomination at the TV Grama Award. Recently she has gained further praise for her role in Amor a la Catalán (2019).

Filmography

Films

Telenovelas

References

1963 births
Living people
Chilean film actresses
Chilean television actresses
Chilean telenovela actresses
Actresses from Santiago
University of Chile alumni
20th-century Chilean actresses
21st-century Chilean actresses